Adéla "Šapi" Šapovalivová (born 17 May 2006) is a Czech ice hockey player and member of the Czech national team, currently playing in the , the Czech third-tier men's under-17 (U17) league, with HC Berounští Medvědi U17 and in the Czech Women's Extraliga with HC Příbram.

Playing career 
From around age three, Šapovalivová regularly attended her brother's ice hockey practices and games. When he outgrew his equipment, she told her parents that she would like to play, too, and reused his gear for herself. She developed as a player on boys' teams in the junior department of HC Berouští Medvědi.

Though she continued to spend most of her time with the boys' teams of HC Berouští Medvědi, the 2020–21 Czech Women's Extraliga season marked the first time she played with a senior women's team and she notched a goal and 2 assists in two games with HC Příbram.

In the 2021–22 season, she played eight games with HC Příbram in which she tallied 11 goals and 8 assists for 19 points and remained a regular in the lineup for HC Berouští Medvědi U17 during the 2021–22 Liga dorostu season.

Speed skating 
Šapovalivová represented the Central Bohemian Region in speed skating at the Winter Olympics for children and youth of the Czech Republic in 2018 and 2020. In 2018, she won bronze medals at the junior girls level in the 111 meter and 333 meter distances and a gold medal in the girls 16-lap relay. In 2020, competing at the senior girls level, she won a bronze medal in the 333 meter distance, silver in the 500 meter distance, and gold in the girls 16-lap relay.

International play 
Šapovalivová played with the Czech women's national under-16 ice hockey team during the 2019–20 season, recording 20 (10+10) points in 14 games. The COVID-19 pandemic, which was declared a global pandemic by the WHO in March 2020, limited the number of opportunities for women to play at the international junior level during 2020 and 2021, and, as a result, Šapovalivová did not participate in any national team matches during the 2020–21 season.

After more than a season away from international competition, Šapovalivová broke onto the scene in 2022. Her first international tournament since 2020 was the girls' ice hockey tournament at the 2022 European Youth Olympic Winter Festival in March 2022, where the Czech women's national under-17 ice hockey team claimed gold. With 2 goals and 2 assists in three games, she was Czechia’s leading scorer and tied Sanni Vanhanen of Finland for fourth in scoring of all players at the tournament. 

Her debut with the national U18 team at the 2022 IIHF U18 Women's World Championship was an attention-grabbing continuation of her stellar breakout season. Šapovalivová tallied 3 goals and 6 assists for 9 points in five games, ranking second of all tournament skaters for scoring. She trailed leading scorer and teammate Tereza Plosová by just one assist and besting third-ranked scorer and tournament MVP Laila Edwards of the United States by a point. Though Czechia missed the medal table and finished in fifth place, Šapovalivová was named to the Media All-Star Team; she was the only player from a non-medaling team to be so honored. Having showcased her speed and doggedness throughout the tournament, she began to draw attention as a player of note both at home and abroad.

The 2022 IIHF Women's World Championship in August 2022 served as her debut with the senior national team and she was the youngest player at the tournament (two months younger than the second-youngest player, Kohane Sato of ). Head coach Carla MacLeod slotted  Šapovalivová onto Czechia's top line alongside Kateřina Mrázová and Natálie Mlýnková, giving a tremendous opportunity to the young player. Regarding Šapovalivová's youth in relation to her placement in the lineup, MacLeod said, "She’s just offensively gifted... If you don’t have the birthdate beside the name, I don’t think you guess her age. She plays with a very mature game… With a high, high level of confidence." 

In Czechia's match against , their second game of the preliminary round, Šapovalivová did not record a point despite logging six shots on goal; the Czech's claimed victory regardless, beating Denmark 5–1. Preliminary game three against  saw Šapovalivová open up the scoring with a power play goal in the thirteenth minute of the first period, assisted by Daniela Pejšová and Mrázová; Czechia ultimately lit the lamp six times to capture their first shutout win of the tournament and secured placement in the quarterfinals. When asked about Šapovalivová’s performance through the third game of the tournament, Czech captain Alena Mills praised, "Šapi plays amazingly. I'm glad she got the chance because she deserves it, which she has shown here."

Personal life 
Šapovalivová's older brother, Matyáš Šapovaliv, is also an ice hockey player, a centre. He was drafted in the second round, 48th overall by the Vegas Golden Knights in the 2022 NHL Entry Draft, and, he has represented Czechia at two IIHF World U18 Championships with the national U18 team and at the 2022 World Junior Ice Hockey Championships with the national U20 team. Matyáš describes Adéla as having a "killer instinct" when it comes to goal scoring, highlighting her tendency to shoot (and score) when in front of the goal.

In the summer of 2022, at age sixteen, Šapovalivová expressed interest in pursuing a college ice hockey career in the United States in the future.

Career statistics

International

Awards and honors

References

External links
 

2006 births
Living people
Czech ice hockey left wingers
Czech women's ice hockey forwards
Ice hockey people from Prague
21st-century Czech women